Spin states when describing transition metal coordination complexes refers to the potential spin configurations of the central metal's d electrons. For several oxidation states, metals can adopt high-spin and low-spin configurations. The ambiguity only applies to first row metals, because second- and third-row metals are invariably low-spin. These configurations can be understood through the two major models used to describe coordination complexes; crystal field theory and ligand field theory (a more advanced version based on molecular orbital theory).

High-spin vs. low-spin

Octahedral complexes 

The Δ splitting of the d orbitals plays an important role in the electron spin state of a coordination complex. Three factors affect  Δ: the period (row in periodic table) of the metal ion, the charge of the metal ion, and the field strength of the complex's ligands as described by the spectrochemical series. Only octahedral  complexes of first row transition metals adopt high-spin states.

In order for low spin splitting to occur, the energy cost of placing an electron into an already singly occupied orbital must be less than the cost of placing the additional electron into an eg orbital at an energy cost of Δ. If the energy required to pair two electrons is greater than the energy cost of placing an electron in an eg, Δ, high spin splitting occurs.

If the separation between the orbitals is large, then the lower energy orbitals are completely filled before population of the higher orbitals according to the Aufbau principle. Complexes such as this are called "low-spin" since filling an orbital matches electrons and reduces the total electron spin.  If the separation between the orbitals is small enough then it is easier to put electrons into the higher energy orbitals than it is to put two into the same low-energy orbital, because of the repulsion resulting from matching two electrons in the same orbital.  So, one electron is put into each of the five d orbitals before any pairing occurs in accord with Hund's rule resulting in what is known as a "high-spin" complex.  Complexes such as this are called "high-spin" since populating the upper orbital avoids matches between electrons with opposite spin.

The charge of the metal center plays a role in the ligand field and the Δ splitting. The higher the oxidation state of the metal, the stronger the ligand field that is created. In the event that there are two metals with the same d electron configuration, the one with the higher oxidation state is more likely to be low spin than the one with the lower oxidation state; for example, Fe2+ and Co3+ are both d6; however, the higher charge of Co3+ creates a stronger ligand field than Fe2+. All other things being equal, Fe2+ is more likely to be high spin than Co3+.

Ligands also affect the magnitude of Δ splitting of the d orbitals according to their field strength as described by the spectrochemical series. Strong-field ligands, such as CN− and CO, increase the Δ splitting and are more likely to be low-spin. Weak-field ligands, such as I− and Br− cause a smaller Δ splitting and are more likely to be high-spin.

Some octahedral complexes exhibit spin crossover, where the high and low spin states exist is dynamic equilibrium.

Tetrahedral complexes 

The Δ splitting energy for tetrahedral metal complexes (four ligands), Δtet is smaller than that for an octahedral complex. Consequently, tetrahedral complexes are almost always high spin  Examples of low spin tetrahedral complexes include Fe(2-norbornyl)4, [Co(4-norbornyl)4]+, and the nitrosyl complex Cr(NO)((N(tms)2)3.

Square planar complexes 
Many d8 complexes of the first row metals exist in tetrahedral or square planar geometry.  In some cases these geometries exist in measurable equilibria. For example, dichlorobis(triphenylphosphine)nickel(II) has been crystallized in both tetrahedral and square planar geometries.

Ligand field theory vs crystal field theory
In terms of d-orbital splitting, ligand field theory (LFT) and crystal field theory (CFT) give similar results. CFT is an older, simpler model that treats ligands as point charges. LFT is more chemical, emphasizes covalent bonding and accommodates pi-bonding explicitly.

High-spin and low-spin systems 

In the case of octahedral complexes, the question of high spin vs low spin first arises for d4, since it has more than the 3 electrons to fill the non-bonding d orbitals according to ligand field theory or the stabilized d orbitals according to crystal field splitting.  

All complexes of second and third row metals are low-spin.

d4 
Octahedral high-spin: 4 unpaired electrons, paramagnetic, substitutionally labile. Includes Cr2+ (many complexes assigned as Cr(II) are however Cr(III) with reduced ligands), Mn3+.
Octahedral low-spin: 2 unpaired electrons, paramagnetic, substitutionally inert. Includes Cr2+, Mn3+.

d5 
Octahedral high-spin: 5 unpaired electrons, paramagnetic, substitutionally labile. Includes Fe3+, Mn2+. Example: Tris(acetylacetonato)iron(III).
Octahedral low-spin: 1 unpaired electron, paramagnetic, substitutionally inert. Includes Fe3+.  Example: [Fe(CN)6]3−.

d6 
Octahedral high-spin: 4 unpaired electrons, paramagnetic, substitutionally labile. Includes Fe2+, Co3+.  Examples: [Fe(H2O)6]2+, [CoF6]3−.
Octahedral low-spin: no unpaired electrons, diamagnetic, substitutionally inert. Includes Fe2+, Co3+, Ni4+. Example: [Co(NH3)6]3+.

d7
Octahedral high-spin: 3 unpaired electrons, paramagnetic, substitutionally labile. Includes Co2+, Ni3+.
Octahedral low-spin:1 unpaired electron, paramagnetic, substitutionally labile. Includes Co2+, Ni3+. Example: [Co(NH3)6]2+.

d8Octahedral high-spin: 2 unpaired electrons, paramagnetic, substitutionally labile. Includes Ni2+. Example: [Ni(NH3)6]2+.
Tetrahedral high-spin: 2 unpaired electrons, paramagnetic, substitutionally labile. Includes Ni2+. Example: [NiCl4]2-.
Square planar low-spin: no unpaired electrons, diamagnetic, substitutionally inert. Includes Ni2+. Example: [Ni(CN)4]2−.

Ionic radii
The spin state of the complex affects an atom's ionic radius. For a given d-electron count, high-spin complexes are larger.

d4
Octahedral high spin: Cr2+, 64.5 pm.
Octahedral low spin: Mn3+, 58 pm.

d5
Octahedral high spin: Fe3+, the ionic radius is 64.5 pm.
Octahedral low spin: Fe3+, the ionic radius is 55 pm.

d6
Octahedral high spin:  Fe2+, the ionic radius is 78 pm, Co3+ ionic radius 61 pm.
Octahedral low spin: Includes Fe2+ ionic radius 62 pm, Co3+ ionic radius 54.5 pm, Ni4+ ionic radius 48 pm.

d7
Octahedral high spin: Co2+ ionic radius 74.5 pm, Ni3+ ionic radius 60 pm.
Octahedral low spin: Co2+ ionic radius 65 pm, Ni3+ionic radius 56 pm.

d8
Octahedral high spin: Ni2+ ionic radius 69 pm.
Square planar low-spin: Ni2+ ionic radius 49 pm.

Ligand exchange rates
Generally, the rates of ligand dissociation from low spin complexes are lower than dissociation rates from high spin complexes. In the case of octahedral complexes, electrons in the eg levels are anti-bonding with respect to the metal-ligand bonds.  Famous "exchange inert" complexes are octahedral complexes of d3 and low-spin d6 metal ions, illustrated respectfully by Cr3+ and Co3+.

References 

Coordination chemistry
Electron states